Bionic Commando Rearmed 2 is a run-and-gun platform game developed by Fatshark and published by Capcom. A sequel to the Bionic Commando Rearmed, it features enhancements to protagonist Rad Spencer's bionic arm, which he primarily uses to grapple to and swing from objects. New bionic enhancements include abilities such as hacking data terminals, a powerful uppercut, and firing grenades.

The game's plot revolves around a dictator named General Sabio and a missing commander from Spencer's organization, Colonel Brubaker. Spencer and a team of four other bionics are sent to locate Brubaker and his platoon and help them complete their mission of disarming Sabio's missiles. The team's original mission evolves as the bionics, split into three teams, face opposition greater than they have previously faced. Reception from critics was lukewarm. Some critics praised the new gameplay mechanics, while others felt that it was a step down from its predecessor.

Gameplay

Bionic Commando Rearmed 2 features many of the action gameplay elements from the original Rearmed. The game is played from a 2.5D perspective, with players being able to move horizontally and vertically. The protagonist is equipped with a bionic arm that can be used to grapple onto scenery, allowing the player to ascend or to swing to otherwise unreachable areas. The arm can also be used as a defensive mechanism, allowing the player to grab barrels and enemies and use them as shields, and to repel larger enemies. Rearmed 2 changes traditional mechanics slightly, requiring users to press a button to release the arm from its hold point, allowing players to user their momentum to swing in any desired arc.

Challenge rooms return in Rearmed 2, but have been altered to require the use of specific abilities in certain challenges. Rearmed 2 features 24 challenge rooms, which are unlocked in a progressive order rather than a group at a time as seen in Bionic Commando Rearmed. Veteran players who've become accustomed to the glitchy swing mechanics of prior entries will be relieved, or frustrated, to know they'll need new strategies for completing some of the challenge rooms, most notably making use of the spike pits in order to progress. Local cooperative gameplay also returns, with the second player controlling a version of Spencer that resembles the one on the cover of the NES version of Bionic Commando.

Rearmed 2 also features new gameplay mechanics. Some of these were first introduced in the 2009 action-adventure game Bionic Commando. These include the ability to jump and maneuver known as Death From Above in which the player slams into the ground upon landing from a fall, causing a shockwave to affect nearby enemies. Once the game is completed players may opt to activate the game's Retro mode which disables the ability to jump. Players can also climb over small obstacles, or onto slightly higher elevations. Entirely new to the series are Components; items and attributes that can be equipped to enhance the player character. Components include a grenade launcher attachment for the bionic arm and a passive heath regeneration ability. The player can upgrade or change Spencer's abilities in the enhancements screen during gameplay. Also, new to the series will be the ability to enter a scanning mode known as Bio Vision. While in this mode players can search for secrets and scan facts about enemies and locales which may help them progress through the game.

Absent from Bionic Commando Rearmed 2 are top-down levels, which in its predecessor symbolized an enemy attack while en route to a location. When the game's producer, Rey Jimenez, was asked why they are being excluded, he responded "People liked them because they were in the original, but I don't remember hearing anyone say that was their favorite part of the game. It doesn't have the swinging, you know?" The game has also linear level progression, without the option to pick and choose the path. Players can, however, be able to return to previous levels, using newly acquired abilities and weaponry, to access areas they were previously unable to, similar to Metroidvania games.

Synopsis

Bionic Commando Rearmed 2 takes place a few years after Bionic Commando Rearmed and prior to 2009's Bionic Commando. In the game, a dictator named General Sabio from the Papagayan Islands threatens to attack the FSA, protagonist Rad Spencer's organization. The FSA sends Colonel Brubaker to confront the dictator, but Brubaker disappears shortly after arriving. In response, a team of five bionics, including Spencer, are sent to combat the threat and locate Brubaker. The group arrives on the islands via helicopter and divides into three teams, Spencer, being the commander, operates alone while the other teams operate in pairs.

En route to Brubaker's last known location Spencer receives a communication from Mag, one of the team leaders, informing him that "something huge" had attacked them, taken her partner McNamara's bionic arm, and forced them to separate. Spencer instructs the team to regroup at Brubaker's last coordinates. Upon arriving Spencer finds the area in shambles with Brubaker's forces dead. Spencer soon discovers that a large mechanized robot designated GORILLA is responsible for the carnage. After disabling the robot, Spencer contacts FSA headquarters to inform them of the situation and the possible demise of Brubaker. Spencer's commanding officer, Joe Gibson (Super Joe) tells him that Brubaker is indeed alive, as his tracking device is still active. He informs Spencer that he may have been taken captive as his signal appears to be moving quickly across the island.  Spencer is again tasked with rescuing Brubaker at all costs and completing his mission.

Shortly afterward Spencer finds one of his operatives, Wilcox, dying outside a factory. Wilcox tells him "something huge" took his bionic legs, killed Hauser, and left him for dead. As Spencer begins to signal for help Wilcox dies. Deep in the factory Spencer confronts GORILLA, disabling it again. He is then contacted by McNamara, one of his remaining team, who struggles to tell Spencer that he must find and disable missiles armed by General Sabio. Upon finding Brubaker's signal, Spencer is knocked unconscious by poison gas while contacting Super Joe. He is placed in a high security prison by Sabio's men, which he promptly escapes. Outside he learns from Mag that Brubaker had actually lost his legs and an arm in the FSA's service. Following a hunch he heads to a nearby facility. Inside he finds Brubaker, equipped with the bionic legs and arm from Spencer's teammates Wilcox and McNamara. He tells Spencer that he has orchestrated a war between the FSA and Sabio's army. In exchange for Sabio's help retrieving and installing the bionic parts Brubaker gave Sabio the coordinates and performance data for all of the FSA missile batteries, giving Sabio the upper hand in the coming war. After a confrontation, the GORILLA robot appears. Brubaker orders it to kill Spencer; however, the robot now sees Brubaker as an "extreme bionic" and confronts him instead, thus allowing Spencer to escape.

Spencer makes his way to Sabio's headquarters in order to disarm the missiles. He tries to convince Sabio of Brubaker's treachery, but is unsuccessful. Defeating Sabio, he boards one of the missiles as it takes off. Spencer disarms several missiles while en route to their target but is unable to disarm the last missile in time. Upon waking from final missile's impact, he is astonished to find that he is alive and that the missile did not explode. He encounters McNamara, who struggles to tell him that he was the one who disabled the final missile. Spencer notices McNamara has equipped the bionic arm of his fallen teammate Hauser in place of his lost arm. As each bionic is synchronized for only one user, the merge drives McNamara insane. Spencer reluctantly battles and defeats the crazed McNamara.

In the game's epilogue the player learns that initially the public was grateful for the bionics' service, but soon began to be fearful and distrust the bionics as more details of the conflict were revealed. The bionic program was ordered to be disbanded and all implants removed or disabled. The player also learns that Super Joe placed the weight of the conflict on Spencer, something that would later drive him to his villainous ways in the future.

Development

Bionic Commando Rearmed 2 was revealed at Capcom's Captivate 2010 event on April 20, 2010. It was developed using the Diesel engine, which was used on both Rearmed and 2009's Bionic Commando. The protagonist, Rad Spencer, received a visual redesign for the sequel to tie in the years between Rearmed and the 2009 3D game. Spencer is equipped with an updated arm, has changed his hair style, and has grown a mustache.

The title originally started development under GRIN, who had developed the previous title.  When the company folded four months into development, Fatshark took over, having worked with GRIN previously on other games. Some key employees worked with Fatshark following the closing of GRIN. Simon Viklund, creative director on the first Rearmed was hired as a creative advisor to the Fatshark team. Of his position with Fatshark, Viklund remarked, "They were taking over things mid-project and I worked as a creative advisor during the hand-over to tell them what they were looking at." Viklund further stated that the original design for the game involved events beyond the existing plot. "I wanted to start off there and end up in a city in the FSA where everyone can see a bionic fighting. [I thought it would be] a nice way to convey that now everyone will see that bionics can't always be controlled." He noted that this would be an event in which the public would notice the dangers of bionics and seek to outlaw them.

Cooperative gameplay is again included in the game, though limited to local multiplayer. Producer Ray Jimenez stated that the reason for this was that the developers "wanted to concentrate on the actual game itself rather than adding new features to it." The splitscreen gameplay was removed from cooperative gameplay. According to Fatshark's Robert Bäckström the developers found that "gameplay became more fun if you played it on the same screen." Bäckström further stated that coop will feature modified gameplay, requiring players to work together to defeat level bosses. Developers added the ability to jump in the game, along with several other abilities from the 2009 3D game Bionic Commando. The developers provided the ability to complete the entire game without ever jumping, which also results in an achievement or trophy. In an interview with Gamereactor, Robert Bäckström stated that although he did not know a definite release date, the developers had completed the game as of December 2010. It was later released in February 2011.

Simon Viklund returns as the game's composer for the sequel. The arrangements were created in Buzz, a freeware virtual studio program. Viklund cited games on the Nintendo Entertainment System as influences for Rearmed 2s music, including the Mega Man series, DuckTales, and Gun.Smoke. When asked about the possibility of a commercial release to the game's soundtrack, Viklund states "I do encourage those who ask me if there will be a BCR2 soundtrack to contact Capcom. Really, it's up to them." A contest was held from July 16, 2010, to August 11, 2010, allowing fans to remix an 8-bit Bionic Commando track for inclusion in the game. On September 14, 2010, two winners were chosen. Their remixes were included in the music for Bionic Commando Rearmed 2.  Regarding the winners' arrangements, Viklund stated "What I had to say about the winning submissions was that I think it's a cliché at this point to bring in the electric guitars on interpretations of old NES songs, and yet it’s always nice to hear that (or any) cliché actually done well. Those two guys both did it really well."

Reception

Bionic Commando Rearmed 2 received "mixed" reviews on both platforms according to the review aggregation website Metacritic. Most reviews cited it as inferior to its predecessor. Sales for 2011 were low, moving only 8,359 units on Xbox Live Arcade.

IGNs Daemon Hatfield gave the game a mediocre score and stated it doesn't feel as special as the original Rearmed. He noted that the ability to jump just makes the game "just another platformer." He also warned potential buyers of Rearmed 2 for the PlayStation 3, referencing the requirement that players must sign into the PlayStation Network before starting the game, a form of digital rights management. The reviewer from GameTrailers gave the Xbox 360 version a more favorable review. He cited some improvements to the swinging mechanics, yet pointed out some fans may not appreciate the jump mechanic.

Brett Elston of GamesRadar felt that the game seemed to be "a scaled-back version" of the original Rearmed. He felt the levels were "watered down" and cited poor frame rate issues. Reviewer Jobert Atienza of 1Up.com stated that "In many respects, it's exactly what I would expect from a follow-up: more of the same with minor enhancements. At the same time, it is just more of the same with some enhancements, but Fatshark seemed to be aiming to make the best damn sequel they could...just without rocking the boat too much." GameSpots Tom McShea gave the game a poor review, criticizing unresponsive controls and cheap deaths. Bryan Vore of Game Informer praised the game's varied environments and the new jump mechanics, but noted that some of the boss battles did not make creative use of the bionic arm's abilities like the original Rearmed.

References

External links

2011 video games
Amputees in fiction
Bionic Commando
Capcom games
Cooperative video games
Diesel (game engine) games
Fatshark games
Interquel video games
Military science fiction video games
PlayStation Network games
Run and gun games
Side-scrolling platform games
Totalitarianism in fiction
Video game sequels
Video games about cyborgs
Video games about terrorism
Video games developed in Sweden
Video games scored by Simon Viklund
Video games set in a fictional country
Video games set on fictional islands
Video games with 2.5D graphics
Works about missing people
Xbox 360 Live Arcade games
Multiplayer and single-player video games